Public Cause Research Foundation (PCRF) was a Delhi, India-based non-governmental organisation (NGO) that campaigned for just, transparent, accountable and participatory governance.

History
Public Cause Research Foundation was established on 19 December 2006 by Arvind Kejriwal, Manish Sisodia and Abhinandan Sekhri. Kejriwal donated the prize money he had received from the Ramon Magsaysay Award as a seed fund.

PCRF was registered under section 80G and 12A of Income tax Act.

National RTI Awards
In 2009, and 2010, PCRF and the Hindustan Times jointly recognised the efforts of several people who had contributed to protecting the right to freedom of information.

There have been no awards since 2010 and, the organisation is no longer listed as an NGO. Its last published accounts were for 2011–2012.

Trustees
Arvind Kejriwal
Kiran Bedi
Prashant Bhushan
Manish Sisodia
Abhinandan Sekhri

References

External links
 Public Cause Research Foundation

Civic and political organisations of India
Organisations based in Delhi
Defunct organisations based in India
Organizations established in 2006
2006 establishments in Delhi